Nitric oxide reductase (NAD(P), nitrous oxide-forming) (fungal nitric oxide reductase, cytochrome P450nor, NOR (ambiguous)) is an enzyme with systematic name nitrous oxide:NAD(P) oxidoreductase. This enzyme catalyses the following chemical reaction

 N2O + NAD(P)+ +   2 NO + NAD(P)H + H+

This enzyme is heme-thiolate protein (P450).

References

External links 
 

EC 1.7.1